Plumularia is a genus of hydrozoans in the family Plumulariidae.

Species
The following species are classified in this genus:
Plumularia acutifrons Fraser, 1938
Plumularia adjecta Fraser, 1948
Plumularia amphibola (Watson, 2011)
Plumularia annuligera Quelch, 1885
Plumularia anonyma Vervoort & Watson, 2003
Plumularia antonbruuni Millard, 1967
Plumularia attenuata Allman, 1877
Plumularia australiensis Watson, 1973
Plumularia australis Kirchenpauer, 1876
Plumularia badia Kirchenpauer, 1876
Plumularia bathyalis Ansín Agís, Vervoort & Ramil, 2014
Plumularia biarmata Fraser, 1938
Plumularia billardi Ansín Agís, Ramil & Calder, 2016
Plumularia caliculata Bale, 1888
Plumularia camarata Nutting, 1927
Plumularia campanuloides Billiard, 1911
Plumularia canariensis Izquierdo, García-Corrales & Bacallado, 1986
Plumularia caulitheca Fewkes, 1881
Plumularia congregata Vervoort & Watson, 2003
Plumularia conjuncta Billiard, 1913
Plumularia contraria Ansín Agís, Vervoort & Ramil, 2014
Plumularia corrugatissima Mulder & Trebilcock, 1915
Plumularia crater Billiard, 1911
Plumularia crateriformis Mulder & Trebilcock, 1911
Plumularia crateroides Mulder & Trebilcock, 1911
Plumularia defecta Fraser, 1938
Plumularia delicata Nutting, 1906
Plumularia dolichotheca Allman, 1883
Plumularia duseni Jäderholm, 1904
Plumularia elongata Billiard, 1913
Plumularia epibracteolosa Watson, 1973
Plumularia excavata Mulder & Trebilcock, 1911
Plumularia exilis Fraser, 1948
Plumularia filicaulis Kirchenpauer, 1876
Plumularia filicula Allman, 1877
Plumularia flabellata Nutting, 1927
Plumularia flabellum Allman, 1883
Plumularia flexuosa Bale, 1894
Plumularia floridana Nutting, 1900
Plumularia gaimardi (Lamouroux, 1824)
Plumularia goldsteini Bale, 1882
Plumularia habereri Stechow, 1909
Plumularia hargitti Nutting, 1927
Plumularia hyalina (Bale, 1882)
Plumularia insignis Allman, 1883
Plumularia insolens Fraser, 1948
Plumularia integra Fraser, 1948
Plumularia jordani Nutting, 1906
Plumularia kirkpatricki Billiard, 1908
Plumularia lagenifera Allman, 1885
Plumularia leloupi Blanco & Bellusci, 1971
Plumularia macrotheca Allman, 1877
Plumularia margaretta (Nutting, 1900)
Plumularia megalocephala Allman, 1877
Plumularia meganema Fraser, 1948
Plumularia meretriacia Watson, 1973
Plumularia michaelseni Stechow, 1924
Plumularia micronema Fraser, 1938
Plumularia milsteinae Ansín Agís, Vervoort & Ramil, 2014
Plumularia mooreana Schuchert, 2013
Plumularia mossambicae Millard, 1975
Plumularia mula Totton, 1936
Plumularia obliqua (Johnston, 1847)
Plumularia opima Bale, 1924
Plumularia orientalis Billiard, 1911
Plumularia paucinema Fraser, 1940
Plumularia paucinoda Nutting, 1900
Plumularia polycladia Mammen, 1967
Plumularia posidoniae (Picard, 1952)
Plumularia procumbens Spencer, 1891
Plumularia propinqua Fraser, 1938
Plumularia pseudocontraria Ansín Agís, Vervoort & Ramil, 2014
Plumularia pulchella Bale, 1882
Plumularia rotunda Mulder & Trebilcock, 1911
Plumularia setacea (Linnaeus, 1758)
Plumularia setaceiformis Mulder & Trebilcock, 1915
Plumularia setaceoides Bale, 1882
Plumularia siliculata (Mammen, 1967)
Plumularia spinulosa Bale, 1882
Plumularia spiralis Billiard, 1911
Plumularia spirocladia Totton, 1930
Plumularia strictocarpa Pictet, 1893
Plumularia strobilophora Billiard, 1913
Plumularia stylifera Allman, 1883
Plumularia sulcata Lamarck, 1816
Plumularia syriaca Billiard, 1931
Plumularia tenuissima Totton, 1930
Plumularia togata Watson, 1973
Plumularia tubacarpa Watson, 2000
Plumularia undulata Yamada, 1950
Plumularia variabilis Quelch, 1885
Plumularia vervoorti Leloup, 1971
Plumularia virginiae Nutting, 1900
Plumularia warreni Stechow, 1919
Plumularia wasini Jarvis, 1922
Plumularia wattsi Bale, 1887

References

Plumulariidae
Hydrozoan genera